Michael Philip Batt, LVO (born 6 February 1949) is an English singer-songwriter, musician, arranger, record producer, director and conductor. He was formerly the Deputy Chairman of the British Phonographic Industry.

Having achieved substantial international success as a solo artist, he is particularly known in the UK for creating The Wombles pop act, writing many hits including the chart-topping "Bright Eyes", and discovering Katie Melua. 

He has also conducted many of the world's great orchestras, including the London Symphony, Royal Philharmonic, London Philharmonic, Sydney Symphony and Stuttgart Philharmonic in both classical and pop recordings and performances.

Early life and career
Michael Philip Batt was born on	6 February 1949, in Southampton, England. He attended Peter Symonds School, Winchester. His blog refers to his role as cadet Company Sergeant Major at the school.

Batt began his career in pop music at the age of eighteen when he answered an advertisement placed by Ray Williams in the New Musical Express on behalf of Liberty Records. Batt initially signed as a songwriter and artist to Liberty, but became head of A&R for the label only months later, at the age of nineteen. He signed and produced Tony (TS) McPhee's The Groundhogs and produced their first album, "Scratching the Surface".  He produced, co-wrote and played piano on Hapshash and the Coloured Coat's second album, Western Flier. Also in 1969, Batt released as producer/artist a Liberty single, his cover version of The Beatles' "Your Mother Should Know". He arranged the strings and brass for the band Family's debut album Music in a Doll's House but his arranger credit was omitted from the album packaging.

1970s
In the early 1970s, aged 23, married, with children, and having spent £11,000 (the price of a small house) recording half of a heavy rock orchestral album that was never released and which nearly bankrupted him, Batt was asked by the producers of a new children's television programme to write the theme music. Instead of taking his £200 fee, Batt asked for the character rights for musical production. The choice produced his first hits as a singer-songwriter/producer by The Wombles, in 1974. The collaboration produced eight hit singles and four gold albums.

By then financially successful, Batt moved on to work with various artists as a songwriter/producer, most successfully with Steeleye Span and their most successful single and album All Around My Hat in 1975. Also in 1975, at the end of the summer, he entered the UK Singles Chart with the only hit under his own name (credited "Mike Batt with the New Edition") with "Summertime City" — used as the theme music to Seaside Special, the BBC Television series recorded in various UK seaside resorts – which reached number 4.

Batt produced Elkie Brooks' version of  "Lilac Wine" in 1978. The song was a hit in the UK and across Europe. He wrote the song "Bright Eyes" for the animated film version of Watership Down. Recorded by Art Garfunkel, it reached number 1 in the UK Singles Chart and was number one in six countries.
Batt also wrote the score for the film Caravans released in 1978.

1980s

As a singer, Batt's solo albums included Schizophonia and Tarot Suite (1979, Epic Records) (both with the London Symphony Orchestra). From these albums came the European hit songs "Railway Hotel", "Lady of the Dawn" and "". The latter tells the story of Moroccans fighting the French colonial power. He worked on these recordings with such fellow artists as Colin Blunstone and Roger Chapman as singers on Tarot Suite. A version of "Introduction (The Journey of a Fool)" from Tarot Suite was used as the theme for the Sydney radio station, Triple M, from its first broadcast in 1980 until well into the 1990s. Over the course of May 2010, this theme tune, still based on the main central riff from "Introduction (The Journey of a Fool)" was re-recorded by Slash, former Guns N' Roses guitarist, as a new theme to mark the 30th anniversary of Triple M in Sydney. This was released to air at the end of June 2010.

In 1980, he released his next solo album, entitled Waves (including the European hit "The Winds of Change"), recorded at Wisseloord Studios in Hilversum, Holland. In the same year, he went off with his family aboard his boat, Braemar, ending up in Australia after two and a half years, travelling via France, the West Indies, South America, Central America, Mexico, Los Angeles, Hawaii and Fiji.

In 1981, on the Los Angeles-Sydney leg of the sea voyage, he was commissioned to write a piece for the 50th anniversary of the Australian Broadcasting Corporation which became the musical fantasy production, Zero Zero. Batt designed, co-directed (with John Eastway) and starred in the studio-based production of "Zero Zero" shot at Gore Hill studios in Sydney and aired by Channel 4 TV in the UK in the week of the Channel's broadcast launch in 1982. The album, featuring Batt with the Sydney Symphony Orchestra was released on Epic as a Mike Batt solo album. The show was a combination of music, mime, dance, acting and animation, telling the story of a young man in the far distant future where love has been genetically eradicated. Batt's character "Number 17" falls in love and is sent to an emotional decontamination centre called "Zero Zero". A single, "Love Makes You Crazy" was released by Sony on Epic Records.

Returning to the UK in 1983, Batt wrote, produced and arranged three more Top Ten hits, "Please Don't Fall in Love" (for Cliff Richard), "A Winter's Tale" (for David Essex, with lyrics co-written by Tim Rice) and "I Feel Like Buddy Holly" (for Alvin Stardust). In the same year, he helped write lyrics for Abbacadabra. In 1983, he wrote and produced "Ballerina (Prima Donna)", which, recorded by Steve Harley, peaked at no. 51 in the UK.

He co-wrote with Andrew Lloyd Webber the title song "Phantom of the Opera" producing and arranging the hit single by Steve Harley and Sarah Brightman that was the genesis of the show. His lyrics were later partially replaced by those of Richard Stilgoe. Batt's arrangement of the song and backing vocal recording are still in the stage version.

The album The Hunting of the Snark, based on Lewis Carroll's poem, was recorded in 1984 and featured a star cast including Art Garfunkel (Butcher), Sir John Gielgud (Narrator), John Hurt (Narrator), Roger Daltrey (Barrister), Cliff Richard (Bellman), Deniece Williams (Beaver), Julian Lennon (Baker) and Captain Sensible (Billiard Marker), and instrumental contributions from George Harrison and Stephane Grappelli.  However, the album was not released at the time after a dispute with Sony Music, to whom Batt had leased the self-financed masters. Batt nevertheless went ahead with a promotional concert at the Royal Albert Hall in 1987, which he filmed at his own expense and which was shown on BBC 2 TV. The concert features Batt conducting The London Symphony Orchestra with soloists Billy Connolly (instead of Cliff Richard) as the Bellman, Roger Daltrey as the Barrister, Deniece Williams as the Beaver, Julian Lennon as the Baker, Captain Sensible as the Billiard Marker, Justin Hayward (instead of Art Garfunkel) as the Butcher, John Hurt as the Narrator and Midge Ure in a cameo as the Banker, playing guitar solos.

Meanwhile, in the late 1980s, Batt also produced, arranged and conducted Justin Hayward's album with the London Philharmonic Orchestra entitled Classic Blue and the music for The Dreamstone, ITV's fifty-two part animated series, once again with the London Philharmonic Orchestra. A number of stars performed for the Dreamstone soundtrack; notably Billy Connolly, Ozzy Osbourne, former British heavyweight boxing champion Frank Bruno (all of whom performed on "The War Song of the Urpneys"), Bonnie Tyler (who sang a duet with Batt, "Into the Sunset". It was not used on the show, but it was meant to be Dreamstone's official love song). Joe Brown performed "The Vile Brothers Mountain Band" along with Gary Glitter. Batt performed the theme song from the series "Better Than A Dream". The first series was completed and broadcast in 1990 and lasted for three more series, ending in 1995.

1990s

In January 1990, Batt was appointed joint Musical Director of the Melbourne Summer Music festival, with the State Orchestra Of Victoria. Among the classical concerts and other programming he conducted, curated and performed on that visit to Australia, he programmed a debut costumed concert of a fuller length version of "The Hunting Of Snark", with narration by Michael Parkinson and the Bellman played by Keith Michell. On a second visit that year (this time to Sydney) he took the opportunity to mount a more ambitious version of the fully expanded show score at the State Theatre, Sydney, featuring well-known Australian stars such as Cameron Daddo, Jackie Love, Jon English, John Waters and Daryl Somers. Having tried out the show in Australia Batt moved towards securing funding and a theatre to mount the show in London's West End, and subsequently did so at the Prince Edward Theatre, opening on 24 October 1991.

The production was designed and directed by Batt and starred Philip Quast as the Bellman, David McCallum as Lewis Carroll, and Kenny Everett as the Billiard Marker. There was a 50 piece live orchestra on stage, hidden variously by venetian blinds and gauzes upon which the scenery was projected entirely from more than 200 projectors and involved 12,000 hand-prepared still slides often moving in rapid succession to create animation. This visual technique had been developed by Batt over the years since the launch of his first solo album "Schizophonia" and had been used in his "Zero Zero" TV production of 1982. The show's revolutionary visual presentation (critic Sheridan Morley wrote in the International Herald Tribune that "the show's design will revolutionise theatre design for years to come") did not save it from a negative reaction by critics that suggested Batt's visuals were spectacular but that the score was unimpressive.

The show survived only seven weeks at the Prince Edward. There has been much argument about the merits of the piece since it closed. A Theatre studies student, Andrew Loretto even wrote his PhD thesis on the subject "The Snark and the Critics".

In 1995, he made a solo album for Sony Germany, Arabesque. Batt was then commissioned to write the official anthem for the inauguration of the Channel Tunnel by the Queen, entitled "When Flags Fly Together". This was performed for the Queen and President Mitterrand, along with many senior politicians, by The Band of the Royal Engineers, and sung by Robert Meadmore.

Batt composed and produced the four million-selling album, The Violin Player, which launched classical violinist Vanessa-Mae (EMI Classics, 1995) from which the top twenty single of his arrangement of J.S. Bach's "Toccata and Fugue" was taken.

In 1997, Batt produced an album for the soprano Anna Maria Kaufmann, with the Royal Philharmonic Orchestra; an original dramatic song cycle called Blame It on the Moon, from which his song, "Running with a Dream" was taken as the theme for Germany's national football team at the 1998 World Cup.

Also in 1998, Batt produced, arranged and conducted the album, Philharmania with the Royal Philharmonic and guest singers included Joey Tempest, Roger Daltrey, Marc Almond, Bonnie Tyler, Status Quo, Huey Lewis, Kim Wilde, Justin Hayward and others. Later the same year, Batt relaunched The Wombles pop group, with two hits, "Remember You’re A Womble" (at number 13) and "The Wombling Song" (at number 27). In 2000, he collaborated with Roy Wood for a single which combined new versions of previous Christmas hits by Wizzard and The Wombles, released as "I Wish It Could Be a Wombling Merry Christmas" – UK number 22). In 1997, the year of The Queen and Prince Philip's Golden Wedding Anniversary, he was commissioned by the military to compose a piece, "Royal Gold" for the massed bands of the Coldstream, Welsh, Irish and Grenadier Guards, together with 100 pipers. The piece was performed in the presence of The Queen and Prince Philip at the Royal Tournament in that year. Batt simultaneously dedicated the piece to his own parents, whose Golden Wedding Anniversary happened to be in the same year.

Later he would compose, arrange and conduct the music for the 1999 Watership Down TV series, with the Royal Philharmonic Orchestra. An ambitious soundtrack album starring Stephen Gately from Boyzone, Paul Carrack from Mike and the Mechanics, Cerys Matthews from Catatonia and the RPO was recorded, but owing to disagreements with the record label, was never meaningfully released and subsequently acquired by Batt for his Dramatico label some years later. His orchestral suite "Watership Down" was created and recorded by the RPO at this time and is released on Dramatico, which was released in a 2 CD set with the soundtrack to Caravans.

Also for the 1999 release of XTC's album Apple Venus Volume 1, he wrote the orchestral arrangements for the tracks "Green Man" and "I Can't Own Her".

2000s, 2010s and current work

After conceiving and co-creating the all-girl string quartet Bond and producing their first single, he then created the eight piece classical crossover band, The Planets. Their album Classical Graffiti was released in February 2002. It went straight to number one in the UK classical music chart on the day of release and remained there for three months.

He formed his own record label Dramatico in 2000, working with a small group of artists including Katie Melua, Carla Bruni, Marianne Faithfull, Caro Emerald, Gurrumul, and Sarah Blasko. From 2005, Dramatico became one of the top UK based indie labels. Batt discovered Katie Melua in 2002 while scouting for a new artist with whom to work. Melua's album Call Off The Search (containing six of Batt's songs including "The Closest Thing to Crazy") was released on Dramatico in November 2003.

After six weeks at number one in the UK Albums Chart, it sold six times platinum, over 1.8 million copies, in the UK and three million copies in total, making Melua the biggest selling UK female artist of 2004. Her second album, Piece by Piece (including Batt's song "Nine Million Bicycles") was released in September 2005, and sold 3.5 million copies in Europe, going to number one in the UK, The Netherlands, Norway, Denmark, Iceland, and achieving top five chart positions in eight other countries. At this point, Melua had become the biggest female UK album artist in the world for that year according to official British Phonographic Industry sales figures.

In 2008, Batt performed and released, A Songwriter's Tale, a compilation album of his hits, newly recorded with the Royal Philharmonic Orchestra, Henry Spinetti, Ray Cooper, Chris Spedding, Mitch Dalton and Tim Harries. The album achieved position 24 in the UK albums chart. In 2011 his record label, Dramatico released the album  "Deleted Scenes From The Cutting Room Floor" By Caro Emerald, achieving more than 400,000 UK sales and paving the way for the release of "The Shocking Miss Emerald" by the same artist in 2013. This album went straight to number one in the UK album charts.

Melua departed the Batt (Dramatico) management stable and record label in January 2014 after a ten-year contract during which she had recorded six albums for Dramatico.  Since 2014, Batt has guided his Dramatico organisation towards a more theatrical/TV /film direction, albeit concentrating on projects which have his music at their core.

He has served on the boards of many industry organisations including The Performing Right Society, the British Academy of Songwriters, Composers and Authors (BASCA) and the British Phonographic Industry (BPI) being Deputy Chairman of the BPI from 2007 until November 2015. He has been a member of the Society of Distinguished Songwriters (SODS) since 1976. His awards include five Ivor Novello Awards issued by The British Academy Of Songwriters, Composers And Authors, according to their records.

Batt was appointed Lieutenant of the Royal Victorian Order (LVO) in the 2013 Birthday Honours for services to the Royal Household.

In August 2014, Batt was one of 200 public figures who were signatories to a letter to The Guardian expressing their hope that Scotland would vote to remain part of the United Kingdom in September's referendum on that issue.

In 2018, he produced and arranged Hawkwind's album The Road to Utopia, consisting primarily of new versions of their 1970s songs with a guest appearance from Eric Clapton. He arranged and conducted a series of concerts of Hawkwind songs featuring the band and orchestra in October and November 2018.

In September 2018, the GUILD classical label released a recording of 'Holst: The Planets Suite for Large Orchestra' played by the Royal Philharmonic Orchestra and conducted by Batt. The release coincided with the centenary of the composition's first performance.

In July 2019 Batt was created a Companion of the Liverpool Institute of Performing Arts by co-founder Paul McCartney.

His fantasy adventure novel The Chronicles Of Don't Be So Ridiculous Valley is published by London Street Books.

In 2022, Batt launched Croix-Noire, an art project with Jean-Charles Capelli, linking music, comics and video games.

Discography
MBO – The Mike Batt Orchestra (1970–1972)
1970: Batt Tracks
1971: Portrait of The Rolling Stones
1971: Portrait of Elton John
1971: Portrait of Simon & Garfunkel
1971: Portrait of Bob Dylan
1972: Portrait of Cat Stevens
1972: Portrait of George Harrison
1974: Portrait of Mike Batt (Sampler 1971–1972)
The Wombles (1973–1978)
1973: Wombling Songs
1974: Remember You’re A Womble
1974: Keep on Wombling
1975: Superwombling
1978: Wombling Free (Soundtrack)
Mike Batt (Since 1973)
1973: Yoga for Health
1973: Moog at the Movies
1974: Ye Olde Moog
1977: Schizophonia
1979: Tarot Suite
1980: Waves
1981: Six Days in Berlin
1982: Zero Zero
1988: Songs of Love and War
1995: Arabesque
Compilations / Reissues
1992: The Winds of Change: Mike Batt Greatest Hits
1999: The Ride to Agadir – Best (1977–1983)
2008: A Songwriter's Tale
2008: A Songwriter's Tale (Special Edition with DVD)
2009: Waves / Six Days in Berlin
2009: Songs of Love / Arabesque
2009: Schizophonia / Tarot Suite
2009: Zero Zero (Special Edition with DVD) 
2009: The Hunting of The Snark (Special Edition with DVD)
2009: Caravans / Watership Down Orchestral Suite
2009: The Dreamstone / Rapid Eye Movement 
2009: A Songwriter's Tale /The Orinoco Kid
2015: A Classical Tale – Compilation of some released and unreleased classical compositions
2020: The Penultimate Collection – Compilation of 34 released and 2 brand new recordings
Musicals
1982: Zero Zero (with Sydney Symphonic Orchestra)
1987: The Hunting of the Snark (with Friends and London Symphony Orchestra)
Soundtracks
1978: Wombling Free
1978: Caravans (with London Philharmonic Orchestra) - For the same titled film
1985: Dragon Dance (Theme of The Dragon)
1990: The Dreamstone (with Friends and London Philharmonic Orchestra) - For the same titled animated series 
1997: Keep the Aspidistra Flying (with London Philharmonic Orchestra) - For the same titled film 
Known as A Merry War (in USA and New Zealand)
2000: Watership Down (with Friends and Royal Philharmonic Orchestra) - For the same titled animated series

Productions
1975: All Around My Hat - Steeleye Span
1976: "Little Does She Know" – Kursaal Flyers
1976: Rocket Cottage - Steeleye Span
1979: Hacienda View – Linda Lewis
1980: "Soldier's Song" – The Hollies
1982: "A Winter's Tale" – David Essex
1983 "Please Don't Fall in Love" – Cliff Richard
1984: "I Feel Like Buddy Holly" – Alvin Stardust
1989: Classic Blue – Justin Hayward / London Philharmonic Orchestra
1995: The Violin Player – Vanessa Mae
1998: Philharmania – Royal Philharmonic Orchestra / Mike Batt
2000: The Wombles Collection (34 track Double CD)
2002: The Classical Graffiti – The Planets
2003: Call Off the Search – Katie Melua
2005: After a Dream – Robert Meadmore
2005: Piece by Piece – Katie Melua
2007: Pictures – Katie Melua
2008: The Katie Melua Collection – Katie Melua
2012: Secret Symphony – Katie Melua
2013: Ketevan – Katie Melua (with Luke Batt)

References
Notes
Biography quoted from various sources, mostly from Batt's official website

External links
 Official website
 Dramatico website

 
 Mike Batt biography by Dieter Friedl
 Mike Batt discography by Dieter Friedl
 Mike Batt compositions and lyrics collected by Dieter Friedl
Interview with Mike Batt in International Songwriters Association's "Songwriter Magazine"

1949 births
Living people
English music arrangers
English record producers
English male singer-songwriters
English conductors (music)
Ivor Novello Award winners
Musicians from Southampton
Lieutenants of the Royal Victorian Order
Conservative Party (UK) people